Pirogov Hospital is a hospital for active treatment and emergency medicine in Sofia, the capital of Bulgaria. It was founded in 1951 and  has a capacity of 795 hospital beds, 33 clinics and departments and employed 2,418 medical and other staff. It was named after Russian surgeon Nikolay Pirogov.

Gallery

External links

Hospital buildings completed in 1951
Hospitals in Bulgaria
Hospitals established in 1951
1951 establishments in Bulgaria